Like. Share. Follow. is a 2017 American psychological horror film written and directed by Glenn Gers. It stars Keiynan Lonsdale and Ema Horvath. The film is a co-production between Blumhouse Productions, Divide/Conquer and Gunpowder & Sky.

The film had its world premiere at the Screamfest Horror Film Festival on October 18, 2017. It was released on October 31, 2017 by Cinemax.

Plot 

Garrett, a rising YouTube star, begins a relationship with Shell, an obsessive fan, who has a deadly, dangerous crush on him and is determined to win his heart by any means necessary.

Cast 
 Keiynan Lonsdale as Garret
 Ema Horvath as Shell
 Nate Hartley as Lyle
 Amy Pham as Kiki
 Abraham Benrubi as Detective Yarden
 Michael Boatman as Norman
 Remy Nozik as Petunia 
 Monica Lopez as Marie
 Andrew Spieler as Bruteburger

Production
Principal photography on the film began on September 15, 2015.

Release
It had its world premiere at the Screamfest Horror Film Festival on October 18, 2017. The film was released on October 31, 2017.

References

External links 
 

2017 films
2017 horror films
2017 horror thriller films
2010s psychological horror films
American psychological horror films
American psychological thriller films
American horror thriller films
American romantic horror films
2010s teen horror films
Films about stalking
Films about social media
Blumhouse Productions films
Cinemax original films
American horror television films
2010s English-language films
2010s American films